Pola de Siero (in Asturian and as official name La Pola Siero, and also known as La Pola colloquially) is a town in the autonomous community of Asturias on the north coast of the Kingdom of Spain. It is the administrative capital of the municipality (concejo) of Siero.

Siero borders on the municipalities of Gijón, to the north, Langreo and San Martín del Rey Aurelio, to the south, Llanera and Oviedo, to the west, and Sariego, Nava and Bimenes, to the east.  It entirely surrounds the municipality of Noreña and touches Villaviciosa at one point: La Peña de los Cuatro Jueces (The Mount of the Four Judges)

According to the Instituto Nacional de Estadística (Spain), Pola de Siero has a population of 12,615 making it the largest population centre in the municipality and the seventh largest in Asturias.

Pola de Siero was founded by a charter of King Alfonso X in 1270.  On the site prior to that date there was a hostel which provided accommodation and sustenance for pilgrims travelling the Way of St. James (Camino de Santiago), en route to or from Santiago de Compostela.

The charter allowed the formation of the town, imposed an annual tax on the inhabitants to be paid to the crown, and granted them a license to hold a weekly market in the town square, Plaza les Campes. This market, a feature of Pola de Siero which continues, every Tuesday, to this day; was the decisive factor in the development of the town.  With the market, the town became the focal point of a large rural area of fertile land, and thereafter other commercial and administrative functions followed.

Notable people 
  Javi Fuego (born 4 January 1984) is a Spanish professional footballer who plays for RCD Espanyol as a defensive midfielder.

References

External links 
 Ayuntamiento (Local Authority) de Pola de Siero website 
 INE Website 
 lapola.net 
 Federación de Conceyos  
 InfoAsturias - Official Tourist Information Website
 Visit Asturias A guide in English
 Portal de Pola de Siero  

Parishes in Siero